The British County Divisions of the Second World War were raised by the British Army in 1941 as a defence against a planned German invasion of Britain. They were static formations which were supposed to command the Independent Infantry Brigades (Home) which were on anti-invasion duties. Each coast in danger had its own County Division.

 Devon and Cornwall County Division
 Dorset County Division
 Durham and North Riding County Division
 Essex County Division (formerly the West Sussex County Division)
 Hampshire County Division
 Lincolnshire County Division
 Norfolk County Division
 Northumberland County Division
 West Sussex County Division (later, the Essex County Division)
 Yorkshire County Division

These formations had none of the usual divisional units that other permanent divisions had. Any they commanded were temporarily on loan from other formations.
Military units and formations of the British Empire in World War II